Paul Denis,  (before 1843 – after 1866) was a lawyer and political figure in Quebec. He represented Beauharnois in the Legislative Assembly of the Province of Canada from 1861 to 1866.

He was born Paul Saint-Denis, possibly in Beauharnois, Quebec. He studied at the Petit Séminaire de Montréal and was admitted to the Lower Canada bar in 1858. Denis set up practice in Beauharnois. He was an unsuccessful candidate for a seat in the Canadian House of Commons in 1867. Denis was named Queen's Counsel in June 1867.

References 

Year of death missing
Members of the Legislative Assembly of the Province of Canada from Canada East
Year of birth uncertain
People from Beauharnois, Quebec
Canadian King's Counsel